Harapan Bangsa Stadium or Lhong Raya Stadium is a multi-use stadium in Banda Aceh, Aceh, Indonesia.  It is currently used mostly for football matches. The stadium holds 45,000 people.

International Match

2017 Aceh World Solidarity Tsunami Cup

See also
 List of stadiums in Indonesia
 List of stadiums by capacity

References

Persiraja Banda Aceh
Football venues in Indonesia
Athletics (track and field) venues in Indonesia
Rugby union stadiums in Indonesia
Buildings and structures in Banda Aceh
Sports venues in Banda Aceh
Sports venues completed in 1997